Sermonti is a family name of Italian origin. Notable people with the surname include:

 Giuseppe Sermonti (1925–2018) Italian biologist
 Pietro Sermonti (born 1971), Italian actor

Italian-language surnames